Huaman (Quechua language, waman falcon[3] or variable hawk[4]) is a Quechuan surname.

It may refer to:

People 
Felipe Huaman Poma de Ayala, colonial Quechua nobleman and Peruvian chronist.
Dr. Augusto Huaman Velasco, Peruvian physician and scientist.
Benjamin Huaman de los Heros, Peruvian lawyer and politician. During the Oncenio de Leguía he was Minister of War (1922-1924), Minister of Finance and Trade (1924-1925), and Prime Minister (1929-1930). He was also a national deputy (1911-1918 and 1920–1925) and deputy of the National Constituent Assembly of 1919. 
Vilchez Huaman, the stage name adopted by Ricardo Wiesse Hamann, Peruvian solo musician and singer, former member of the tropical music duet/band La mente, also ex-member of Suda and Pura Purita.
Liner “Pac-Man” Huaman, Peruvian boxer.
Miky Joaquin Dipas Huaman, Peruvian politician and congressman for the Ayacucho region.
Jorge Huaman, retired Peruvian footballer.
Zoila Huaman, Peruvian female volleyball player.
Paola Limo Huaman, Peruvian female model.
Dr. Zosimo Huaman Cueva, Peruvian scientist and agronomist.

Places 

Vilcas Huaman (Quechua language, sacred falcon), once a major Inca city of 40,000 people.
Sacsay Huaman Fortress, once an Inca citadel complex, famous for its 5-story towers watching over Cusco, and for its megalithic walls which can be partially seen today.
Santiago de Huaman, a town in Trujillo, Peru.

Quechuan-language surnames